Tučapy is a municipality and village in Tábor District in the South Bohemian Region of the Czech Republic. It has about 800 inhabitants.

Administrative parts
Villages of Brandlín and Dvorce are administrative parts of Tučapy.

Sights

The landmark of Tučapy is the Church of Saint James the Great. A parish church in Tučapy was first mentioned in the 14th century. The current building dates from 1724.

The are several monuments connected with the Jewish community, which was the largest in the region in the 19th century. The monuments include former Jewish school, synagogue and cemetery. The oldest preserved tombs in the cemetery dates from 1737.

Notable people
Karel Ančerl (1908–1973), conductor

References

Villages in Tábor District